SSAA may refer to:

Sporting Shooters Association of Australia
SSAA choir, vocal music for soprano, soprano, alto and alto parts
Supersampling anti-aliasing, a spatial anti-aliasing method